SS D.M. Clemson was a  long steel-hulled Great Lakes freighter that went missing on 1 December 1908, on Lake Superior. The ship was last seen coming through the Soo Locks, onto Lake Superior. The ship was built in 1903 for the Provident Steamship Company. She is known for sinking on Lake Superior, on the night of 1 December 1908 with all hands; 24 men lost their lives. The wreck of D.M. Clemson is still missing, and the cause of her sinking remains a mystery to this day.

Possible cause of the sinking

Historian and author Frederick Stonehouse discussed the disappearance of the Clemson in his book "Went Missing". According to Stonehouse the Clemson suffered some structural damage when she struck a lighthouse pier at Ashtabula, Ohio, on October 20, 1908. The incident damaged 10 hull plates and a water tank on the 
starboard side. Temporary repairs were made before the Clemson went into layup for the winter of 1908. Another theory suggests that the Clemson's wooden hatch covers failed causing water to leak into the cargo hold and sink the ship.

Aftermath

There were no survivors to tell what happened to the ship. However, for weeks debris and some bodies from the 24 crew members washed ashore from the ill-fated ship  between Crisp Point and Grand Marais. One of the bodies found was the body of the Clemson's watchman, Simon Dunn of Dublin, Ireland, which washed ashore at Crisp Point. Dunn was wearing a life jacket with D.M. Clemson written on it. Later, pieces of the ship's cabin, 23 of the ship's wooden hatch covers and at least three more bodies were seen floating further west. Only one other body was recovered, and was identified as second mate Charles Woods of Marine City, Michigan.

A second vessel named D.M. Clemson was launched in 1917.

See also
SS Cyprus

References

1903 ships
Shipwrecks of Lake Superior
Ships built in Superior, Wisconsin
Missing ships
Maritime incidents in 1908
Steamships of the United States
Great Lakes freighters
Ships lost with all hands
Merchant ships of the United States
Ships powered by a triple expansion steam engine
Shipwrecks of the Michigan coast
Ships sunk in storms